Being Funny in a Foreign Language is the fifth studio album by English band The 1975. It was released on 14 October 2022 by Dirty Hit.
The album was recorded primarily at Real World Studios in Wiltshire. The band released the lead single "Part of the Band" on 7 July 2022, which was followed by the subsequent singles "Happiness", "I'm in Love with You" and "All I Need to Hear".

The album was nominated for Album of the Year at the 2023 Brit Awards.

Background
Many of the band's 2020 shows that were postponed due to the COVID-19 pandemic were ultimately canceled on 12 January 2021. During this time, lead singer Matty Healy teased future music under their previous name "Drive Like I Do", and said that the band was working on their fifth studio album. However, there was no indication as to when writing, recording, or mixing would be finished.

On 14 February 2022, the band deactivated their main social media accounts, hinting at new material.

The album title and track listing were revealed to select fans through postcards. The band released its first single from the album "Part of the Band" on 7 July 2022. The second single, "Happiness", was released on 3 August 2022. The third single, "I'm in Love with You", was released on 1 September 2022. The fourth single, "All I Need to Hear", was released on 21 September 2022.

Recording and production

Writing sessions for what would eventually become Being Funny in a Foreign Language started in 2021, when the band worked on-and-off with producer BJ Burton, whom Healy admired for his production work on Bon Iver's 22, A Million (2016) and Low's Double Negative (2018) and Hey What (2021). During their time together, Burton noticed that his creative process varied greatly from the band's, as they would "[pull] up songs from Spotify, or [check] another reference for a chord progression" while writing. He set out to align their differences, and eventually they did record what amounted to be "sparks where songs were being bred ... a bunch of early demos", but after Burton heard that the band began working with producer Jack Antonoff, he ended the sessions. In an August 2022 interview with Pitchfork, Burton indicated that the band's creative pivot still "stung", though Healy indicated he was hoping to rekindle his working relationship Burton for a future album.

When recording with Antonoff, the band was determined to focus on their instrumental strong-suits and keep things as live and unadulterated by computers as possible. In an interview with Apple Music 1, Healy amounted the process to outright defining the true sonic identity of the band, while host Zane Lowe described it as the next step for a band with "such restless energy" as the 1975. Lowe cited that the band had "exhausted" their stylistic exploration and had reached a point of reflection on their improved technical skill in this record. Similarly to Burton, Healy sought out to work with Antonoff, whom he called the "biggest producer in the world" out of respect for his production capabilities, specifically his work with American singer-songwriter Lana Del Rey. However, Healy made it clear to Antonoff that he retained full creative control of the recording process while working together.

Promotion
To support the album, the band embarked on an international concert tour titled 'The 1975 at Their Very Best'. The tour's North American leg begun on 3 November 2022 in Uncasville, Connecticut at Mohegan Sun Arena and ran twenty-five shows before transferring to Europe for a fourteen date run through the United Kingdom and Ireland that begun on 8 January 2023 in Brighton at the Brighton Centre.

Critical reception 

Being Funny in a Foreign Language received critical acclaim upon its release. At Metacritic, which assigns a normalised rating out of 100 based on reviews from mainstream critics, the album received a score of 82 out of 100, based on reviews from 16 critics, indicating "universal acclaim". The album was rated an 7.6 out of 10 on the aggregator AnyDecentMusic?.

Brady Brickner-Wood of Pitchfork wrote that the album "tames the group's taste for excess and plays up their fundamentals: goopy '80s guitars, pumping drums, schmaltzy saxophones, and infuriatingly good hooks" and praised the band's experimentation, noting that "even when their songs reek of camp, Healy has enough moxie to elevate a potentially horrible idea into an eloquent exclamation point". El Hunt, writing for NME, noted how the band "tightened things up" on Being Funny in a Foreign Language, calling Healy's songwriting on the album "his most contradictory and intriguing yet, frequently turning his pen back on himself", concluding that the record "feels like the right next step after pushing experimental excess to its logical conclusion, and is comparatively lean with just eleven tracks to its name. 'The 1975: At Their Very Best' – the lofty, and slightly tongue-in-cheek title they’ve given to their upcoming tour – might be infuriatingly, brilliantly cocky, but let’s face facts: it’s also pretty accurate."

Year-end lists

Track listing

Personnel

The 1975
 Matthew Healy – vocals, guitar, drums, piano, Clavinet, percussion, string arrangements, production, creative direction
 George Daniel – drums, keyboards, synthesizers, backing vocals, piano, percussion, programming, string arrangements, production
 Adam Hann – guitar, backing vocals, programming
 Ross MacDonald – bass guitar, double bass, keyboards, backing vocals

Additional musicians
 Jack Antonoff – guitar, piano, drums, backing vocals, violin, programming, string arrangements
 Tommy King – keyboards, synthesizer
 BJ Burton – synthesizer, programming
 James Squire – backing vocals, piano, Wurlitzer, Clavinet, synthesizer, organ, acoustic guitar
 John Waugh – saxophone
 Evan Smith – brass
 Bobby Hawk – strings
 Warren Ellis – strings
 Michelle Zauner – backing vocals
 Oli Jacobs – Wurlitzer
 Carly Holt – additional vocals
 Zem Audu – saxophone
 Sabrina the Teenage DJ – programming
 Bobby Hawk – string arrangements
 Warren Ellis – string arrangements
 Ben Hudson – additional programming (track 10)

Technical
 Jack Antonoff – production
 BJ Burton – co-production (tracks 1, 5)
 Robin Schmidt – mastering
 Manny Marroquin – mixing
 Chris Galland – mixing
 Laura Sisk – engineering
 Oli Jacobs – engineering
 Andrew Gearhart – additional engineering
 Dave Gross – additional engineering
 Evan Smith – additional engineering
 Jon Gautier – additional engineering
 Jeremie Inhaber – mixing assistance
 Robin Florent – mixing assistance
 Scott Desmarais – mixing assistance
 Dani Perez Carasols – engineering assistance
 Dom Shaw – engineering assistance
 Freddy Williams – engineering assistance
 John Rooney – engineering assistance
 Katie May – engineering assistance
 Liam Hebb – engineering assistance

Visuals
 Samuel Burgess-Johnson – artwork, creative direction
 Samuel Bradley – photography
 Patricia Villirillo – creative direction
 Ed Blow – creative direction

Charts

Weekly charts

Year-end charts

Certifications

References

2022 albums
The 1975 albums
Albums produced by Jack Antonoff
Dirty Hit albums